Stuart Laing (born 22 July 1948) is a former British diplomat and was Master of Corpus Christi College, Cambridge from 2008 to 2018.

Career as diplomat
Laing entered the diplomatic service in 1970. During his service in the Diplomatic Service, Laing held the following offices:
 Deputy Ambassador to the Czech Republic—1989–1992
 Deputy Ambassador to Saudi Arabia—1992–1995
 High Commissioner to Brunei—1998–2002
 Ambassador to Oman—2002–2005
 Ambassador to Kuwait—2005–2008

Academic career
Laing graduated from Corpus Christi College, Cambridge in 1970 having studied Classics. He was appointed Master of his old college Corpus Christi on 1 October 2008 succeeding Oliver Rackham, and retired from that position in August 2018. He researches and writes on Arab and East African history and in 2012 he published, jointly with Robert Alston, Unshook till the end of time, a book on the history of Britain's relationship with Oman. The degree of M.Phil. was conferred to him in 2013 for a thesis on the ending of the slave trade in the Indian Ocean. In 2017 he published a biography of the ivory trader Tippu Tip (Hamed bin Mohammed al-Murjabi).

Personal life
Laing is a keen amateur musician; he plays keyboard instruments and the oboe. His other recreations are desert travel and hill-walking. Laing is married to Sibella (daughter of Sir Maurice Henry Dorman, herself a graduate in History of Newnham College, Cambridge) and has a son and two daughters.

References

 

 

Alumni of Corpus Christi College, Cambridge
1948 births
Living people
Masters of Corpus Christi College, Cambridge
High Commissioners of the United Kingdom to Brunei
Ambassadors of the United Kingdom to Oman
Ambassadors of the United Kingdom to Kuwait